Hungama is a 1971 Bollywood comedy film. The film stars Kishore Kumar, Vinod Khanna and Zeenat Aman.

Plot
Bade, a rich businessman worked with his younger brother Chote. They were a mean and miserly pair. Their nephew Mehmood was a spendthrift. So they decided to get him married. But on the wedding day, the nephew ran away from home.

Cast
Kishore Kumar ... Gareebchand a.k.a. Badey
Vinod Khanna ... Preetam  
Zeenat Aman ... Nisha  
Johnny Walker ... Naseebchand a.k.a. Chhotey
Mehmood ... Jagdeep
Helen ... Chameli
Aruna Irani ... Sweety
Faryal
Mukri ... Talaram Dalaal  
Dhumal ... Banaspati Prasad   
Khalid Siddiqui (as Master Khalid)

Soundtrack
The music of the film was composed by R.D. Burman, while lyrics were written by Anjaan.

"Suraj Se Jo Kiran Ka Naata" - Lata Mangeshkar, Mukesh
"Waah Ri Kismat Waah Waah" - Asha Bhosle, Manna Dey
"Kachchi Kali Kachnaar Ki" - Asha Bhosle, Manna Dey
"Meri Jawaani Teri Deewaani" - Asha Bhosle
"Ai Door Se Baat Karna Ri" - Kishore Kumar, Asha Bhosle

External links
 

1971 films
Films scored by R. D. Burman
1970s Hindi-language films
1971 comedy films